{{DISPLAYTITLE:¡Qué fácil es estar en pareja! (18.379 consejos básicos)}}¡Qué fácil es estar en pareja! (18.379 consejos básicos) (It's easy to be a couple! 18,379 basic tips)'' is a comedy book by Argentine author Luis Pescetti. It was first published in 1995.

Books by Luis Pescetti
1995 books
Comedy books